Antero Manninen (born 19 January 1973), also known as ‘‘‘Mr. Cool’’’, is a session musician and former band member of Finnish Cello metal quartet Apocalyptica. He was an official member but did not write the music and left in 1999 due to prior commitments, although he has come back to help the band several years ago. His seated, calm composure playing style is at stark contrast with the headbanging antics of the others when playing live.
Besides his job in Apocalyptica he used to work as a musician in a Tapiola Sinfonietta Avanti! and Finnish Radio Symphony Orchestra and in the orchestra of the Finnish National Opera. He is also one of the founders of Sibelius-Academy’s Cellosextet (SSS). Antero has also been performing at funerals. Currently he is a member of the Lahti Symphony Orchestra.

Equipment
 Giuseppe Pedrazzini cello (1946).
 L. Breshnev bow.
 Jargar (Larsen in the adjacent picture) top strings and Spirocore (by Thomastik-Infeld) Tungsten bottom strings.

References

 https://web.archive.org/web/20071015123212/http://apocalyptica.free.fr/antero-en.htm
 https://web.archive.org/web/20110502054116/http://apocalyptica1.w.interia.pl/sklad.html
 https://web.archive.org/web/20070621175054/http://www.btinternet.com/~spookyuki/apo/agw.htm

1973 births
Living people
musicians from Tampere
Finnish classical cellists
Finnish heavy metal cellists
Apocalyptica members